Debabrata Bandyopadhyay (born 1931) is a Member of Parliament representing All India Trinamool Congress in the Rajya Sabha from West Bengal. He was Executive Director of the Asian Development Bank and had  retired from the ADB from December 1991

He had studied B.A. with Honours in Economics at Presidency College at Kolkata and completed  M.A. (Economics) at University of Calcutta at Kolkata.

References

1931 births
Living people
Trinamool Congress politicians from West Bengal
Rajya Sabha members from West Bengal
Politicians from Kolkata
Place of birth missing (living people)
University of Calcutta alumni